Fine Powder is a 1996 Argentine drama film, written and directed by Esteban Sapir.  The picture features Facundo Luengo, Belén Blanco, Marcela Guerty, among others.

Plot
The film tells of Thomas (Facundo Luengo) a Jewish grown man who lives with his grandmother in the industrial section of a large Argentine city.

His life isn't going exactly as planned. Though he has impregnated his girlfriend Ana, he finds himself avoiding her because he has fallen in love with Alma, so he ignores Ana.

When he needs to make some money, he hooks up with a drug dealer, and this makes matters worse.

Distribution
The film was first presented at the Havana Film Festival in Cuba in December 1996. It opened in Argentina on April 23, 1998.

Cast
 Facundo Luengo as Tomás Caminos
 Belén Blanco as Ana
 Marcela Guerty as Alma
 Miguel Ángel Solá as Profesor de violín
 Juan Leyrado as Selector de personal
 Ana María Giunta as Selectora de personal
 Ricardo Merkin as Dealer
 Sandro Nunziatta as Padre
 Nora Zinski as Madre
 Laura Martín as Hermana
 Fanny Robman as Abuela
 Hernán Pérez as Novio
 Alicia Mariola as Maestra
 Alejandro Sisco as Policía
 Miguel Kukoski as Diariero
 Eulalio Segovia as Mozo

Awards
Wins
 Havana Film Festival: FIPRESCI Prize - Special Mention, Esteban Sapir; 1996.

Nominations
 Molodist International Film Festival, Ukraine: Best Film Award; Best Full-Length Fiction Film, Esteban Sapir; 1997.
 Argentine Film Critics Association Awards: Silver Condor; Best Editing, Marcelo Dujo and Miguel Martin; Best First Film, Esteban Sapir; 1999.

References

External links
 
 Fine Powder at the cinenacional.com 
 

1996 films
1996 drama films
Argentine black-and-white films
Argentine independent films
1990s Spanish-language films
Argentine drama films
1996 independent films